Zhang Miao (born July 8, 1991) is a Chinese para table tennis player. She has won six Asian table tennis titles in both singles and team events along with Gu Gai, Zhang Bian and Zhou Ying.

Miao has polio and is from Xiao County, just like para table tennis star Ren Guixiang. She has been coached by Heng Xin.

References

1991 births
Living people
Table tennis players from Anhui
Paralympic table tennis players of China
Table tennis players at the 2012 Summer Paralympics
Table tennis players at the 2016 Summer Paralympics
Medalists at the 2012 Summer Paralympics
Medalists at the 2016 Summer Paralympics
Chinese female table tennis players
Paralympic gold medalists for China
Paralympic silver medalists for China
Paralympic medalists in table tennis
People from Xiao County
People with polio
Table tennis players at the 2020 Summer Paralympics